Soltan Ahmad Mirza Azod od-Dowleh was prince of Persia and 49th son of Fath-Ali Shah Qajar.

He was born on 16 July 1824. His mother was Taj ol-Dowleh. He was governor of many cities including Zanjan, Malayer and Qazvin. Also he was chairman of Astan Quds Razavi.

He published a book, which is named Azodi history that contains the history of three Qajar dynasty kings, Agha Mohammad Khan Qajar, Fath-Ali Shah Qajar and Mohammad Shah Qajar. One the key features of this book is that the author didn't censor anything and every thing that is written is obvious and clear.

He had four children:
Abd Al-Mohammad Mirza Seyf od-Dowleh
Abdol Majid Mirza
Vajih Allah Mirza
Shams od-Dowleh, who married to Naser Al-Din Shah and became queen consort.

See also
Qajar dynasty
Badr-almoluk
Irandokht
Ali Mirza Khan

References

Qajar princes
1902 deaths
1824 births